The 1980 European Formula Two season was contested over 12 rounds. Toleman driver Brian Henton clinched the championship title.

Calendar

Championship

Notes
Race 2 was originally scheduled for 30 laps, but abandoned due to Markus Höttinger's fatal crash.
Hans-Georg Bürger was fatally injured in the warm-up for Race 9.

Non-championship
An additional Formula Two race was held in which did not count towards the championship.

Results

Drivers' Championship

Results in bold indicate pole position; results in italics indicate fastest lap.
Points system: 9-6-4-3-2-1 for first six finishers. Each driver's best nine results counted towards the championship.

References

Formula Two
European Formula Two Championship seasons